The Jin dynasty was a Jurchen-led dynasty of China that ruled over northern China and Manchuria from 1115 until 1234. After the Jurchens defeated the Liao dynasty and the Northern Song dynasty, they would continue to use their coins for day to day usage in the conquered territories. In 1234, they were conquered by the Mongol Empire (which later evolved into the Yuan dynasty; further reading: Yuan dynasty coinage).

History 

Although the Jin dynasty had started issuing paper Jiaochao in 1154, they didn’t produce coins until the year 1158, prior to that coins from the preceding Liao and Song dynasties continued to circulate within Jurchen territory, as well as a continuing large inflow of coins produced by the Song, this was because the territory of the Jin didn't have enough copper to meet the demand. Jin era coins circulated alongside paper money and silver sycees, and were the main medium of exchange for the general population.

In the beginning iron coins continued to circulate but this had become to be perceived as an inconvenience so the Jin government ordered the immediate ban on melting down copper for usage other than currency, and was quick to open more copper mines to manage the production of copper coinage. 3 mints were opened that together produced 140,000 strings of coins a year (or 140,000,000 cash coins annually), after inflation had become a problem this production became less profitable for the Jin government.

Coins produced by the Jin dynasty compared to earlier Liao dynasty coinage are both of higher quality, and quantity; this is because the Jurchens chose to model their coins more closely after the Song’s both in production as superficially in its calligraphic style.

Due to the constant Mongol invasions and high military expenditures, coins cast after 1209 had become a rarity.

List of coins produced by the Jin dynasty 

Coins produced by the Jurchen Jin dynasty include:

Da Qi coinage 
In 1130 during the Jin–Song Wars the Jin dynasty had set up a second puppet state called “Da Qi” (after the failed first puppet state, Da Chu), this puppet state briefly produced its own coins until it was defeated by the Song in 1137.

Coins produced by the brief Jurchen vassal state include:

Eastern Xia coinage 
According to information from an attempted seller, in a small coin hoard in the Russian Far East in 2011 new seven cash coins were discovered, these coins bore the inscription Dongzhen Xingbao (東眞興寶) alluding to a rebel state named Eastern Xia that was founded during the Mongol conquest of the Jin dynasty.

See also 

 Ancient Chinese coinage
 History of Chinese currency
 Liao dynasty coinage 
 Ming dynasty coinage
 Qing dynasty coinage
 Southern Song dynasty coinage
 Western Xia coinage
 Yuan dynasty coinage
 Zhou dynasty coinage

References

Citations

Sources 

 Hartill, David (September 22, 2005). Cast Chinese Coins. Trafford, United Kingdom: Trafford Publishing. .

External links 
 

Coinage
Coins of China
Cash coins 
Currencies of China
Medieval currencies
Chinese numismatics